Lewis George Post (April 12, 1875 – August 21, 1944), was a Major League Baseball player.

Post was born in 1875 in Woodland, Michigan.

Post played for the Detroit Tigers in 1902.  Post played in three games over a two-day span from September 21 to 22.  He had one hit in 12 at-bats for a .083 career batting average. He played in the outfield made one error in five chances. He was the eighth person to appear in right field for the Tigers during the 1902 season. He also played for Flint in the Michigan State League.

Post later worked as an elevator operator at the county hospital in Chicago. He died at his home in Chicago in 1944.

In early baseball encyclopedias, he is listed under the name "E. Poste", before further research in the 1980s revealed his full, proper name.

External links

1875 births
1944 deaths
Detroit Tigers players
Baseball players from Michigan
Major League Baseball right fielders
Flint (minor league baseball) players